Frederick Charles Polhill-Turner (14 March 1826 – 18 August 1881), known as Frederick Polhill until 1853, was a British Conservative politician.

Political career 
After three unsuccessful attempts in April 1859, June 1859 and 1868, Polhill-Turner was elected MP for Bedford in 1874, but was defeated at the next election in 1880.

Military career 
Polhill-Turner served in the 6th Dragoon Guards - also known as the Carabiniers - and in 1848 became a captain. He then retired in 1852. In 1860, he became Captain of the Duke of Manchester's Mounted Volunteers.

Family 
Polhill-Turner was the son of former Bedford MP, Frederick Polhill and Frances Margaretta Deakin. In 1852, he married Emily Frances Barron, daughter of Henry Barron and Anna-Leigh Guy Page-Turner. He assumed the additional surname of Turner in 1853.

Other activities 
Polhill-Turner was also a Justice of the Peace and, in 1855, became High Sheriff of Bedfordshire.

References

External links
 

UK MPs 1874–1880
1826 births
1881 deaths
High Sheriffs of Bedfordshire
Conservative Party (UK) MPs for English constituencies
People from the Borough of Bedford